The 2018 Winnipeg Blue Bombers season was the 61st season for the team in the Canadian Football League (CFL) and their 86th season overall. This was the fifth season under head coach Mike O'Shea and the fifth full season under general manager Kyle Walters. Following a week 20 win over the Calgary Stampeders, the Blue Bombers qualified for the playoffs for the third consecutive season, rebounding from a 5–7 record to start the season. The Blue Bombers defeated the Saskatchewan Roughriders in the West Division Semi-Final to start the postseason and appeared in their first Division Final since 2011, playing against the Stampeders in the 2018 edition. The team lost against the Stampeders 22–14, extending the franchise's Grey Cup drought for a 28th year.

Offseason

CFL draft
The 2018 CFL Draft took place on May 3, 2018. The Blue Bombers had seven selections in the eight-round draft after trading their first and second round selections to the BC Lions for their second round pick in the 2018 draft and their first round pick in the 2019 CFL Draft. The Bombers also lost a third-round pick after taking Drew Wolitarsky in the 2017 Supplemental Draft but gained Toronto's after dealing Drew Willy to the Argonauts in 2016.

Preseason

Regular season

Standings

Schedule

Post-season

Schedule 
The Winnipeg Blue Bombers win against Saskatchewan in the 2018 West Division Final was the first playoff win for the Blue Bombers franchise since their 19-3 victory against the Hamilton Tiger-Cats in the 2011 East Division Final. Their West Final game against the Calgary Stampeders team marked the first time since the 2001 Grey Cup Game that both the Blue Bombers and Stampeders met in playoff contention (the Winnipeg Blue Bombers were then representing the CFL's East Division when there were only eight teams in the Canadian Football League).

Team

Roster

Coaching staff

References

Winnipeg Blue Bombers seasons
2018 Canadian Football League season by team
2018 in Manitoba